Ayyare is a 2012 Indian Telugu-language comedy film written and directed by Saagar K Chandra. It is produced by Sudhakar Babu Bandaru and Sri Rangana Achhappa under the Preetam Productions. It stars Rajendra Prasad, Sivaji and Anisha Singh, with music composed by Sunil Kashyap.

Plot
Prasad (Rajendra Prasad) is a security guard who dotes upon his daughter. However, his life takes a turn when the girl is diagnosed with cancer and a huge amount is required for her recovery. So, he plans to go to Muscat, but that misfires and some unexpected circumstances emerge to him as a Swamiji. Meanwhile, Venkatesam (Sivaji), a mechanic falls for Anjali (Anisha), daughter of multi-millionaire Siva Prasad (Dr. Sivaprasad). He accepts their alliance in the beginning, but later refuses without giving any reasons. Here, a link arises between Prasad and Venkatesam, which also involves a police officer Gajapathi (Sai Kumar). What is that link? How the whole thing gets resolved forms the rest of the story.

Cast

Rajendra Prasad as Prasad / Swamiji / Lord Krishna
Sivaji as Venkatesam
Anisha Singh as Anjali
Sai Kumar as Gajapathi
M. S. Narayana
Ali
Venu Madhav
Dr. Siva Prasad as Siva Prasad
Harsha Vardhan
Prasad Babu
Shankar Melkote
Srinivasa Reddy
Dhanraj
Tarzan
Jenny

Soundtrack 

Music was composed by Sunil Kashyap. Music was released on MADHURA Audio Company.

Reception 
The Times of India rated the film 2.5/5 and wrote, "Though the film is made on a tight budget, the director’s attempt to tackle the subject of mindless idolization of Godmen and fake babas is laudable." 123telugu called the film "thought provoking" and stated: "It nicely captures the innocence with which people blindly follow many fake ‘Babas’ these days. The movie is entertaining and captivating in the second half. Tighter screenplay and better narration in the first half would have greatly helped matters."

References

External links 
 

2010s Telugu-language films
Films directed by Saagar K Chandra